Spintharus davidattenboroughi is a species of comb-footed spider in the family Theridiidae. It is found in Jamaica. It is one of 15 new species described in 2018.

See also
 List of things named after David Attenborough and his works

References

Theridiidae
Spiders described in 2018
Spiders of the Caribbean